Olga Yuryevna Koroleva (born 30 April 1979) is a former Russian freestyle skier.

Koroleva finished 4th in Aerial skiing at the 2002 Winter Olympics.

References

External links

Russian female freestyle skiers
Freestyle skiers at the 2002 Winter Olympics
Freestyle skiers at the 2006 Winter Olympics
1979 births
Living people
Olympic freestyle skiers of Russia